Qaratuğay (also, Karatogay, Kara-Tugai, and Karatugay) is a village and municipality in the Sabirabad Rayon of Azerbaijan.  It has a population of 1,698.

References 

Populated places in Sabirabad District